Paulo Assunção da Silva (born 25 January 1980), known as Paulo Assunção, is a Brazilian retired professional footballer who played as a defensive midfielder.

He was best known for his positioning and tackling, and also held a Portuguese passport due to the many years in spent in the country, mainly at the service of Porto. He also played four years in La Liga with Atlético Madrid, winning two Europa League trophies.

Club career

Early years and Porto
Assunção was born in Várzea Grande, Mato Grosso. After first appearing professionally for Palmeiras he emigrated to Portugal, having a short stint with FC Porto's reserves and returning shortly to Palmeiras. In the 2002–03 season he joined Madeira's C.D. Nacional, and made his Primeira Liga debut on 26 January 2003 in a 0–0 home draw against Vitória de Guimarães.

After two highly successful individual campaigns, Assunção was purchased again by Porto, but would be loaned for 2004–05 to AEK Athens FC, managed by former Porto coach Fernando Santos. In July 2005 he returned, going on to be an instrumental element in the team's midfield (alongside Raul Meireles and Lucho González) as they eventually won three consecutive league championships.

Assunção left Porto after being threatened with a shot to the knee by FC Porto supporters who wanted him to renew his contract.

Atlético Madrid
In early July 2008, after buying out the remainder of his contract, Assunção joined Atlético Madrid. He adjusted quickly with the capital side, playing all La Liga matches safe four and helping them repeat the fourth-place finish, with a subsequent qualification to the UEFA Champions League.

Defensive-minded Assunção scored his first goal for the Colchoneros on 17 January 2010, during the team's 3–2 home win against Sporting de Gijón. whilst continuing as the undisputed starter at holding midfielder. He lost that position midway through the 2010–11 season, to newly signed Mario Suárez.

In the 2011–12 campaign, Assunção was only fourth choice in his position after Suárez, Gabi and Tiago. He did contribute six appearances – four starts – as Atlético reached and won the UEFA Europa League final.

São Paulo and Deportivo
After more than one decade in European football, Assunção returned to his country to play for São Paulo. The deal was confirmed on 21 July 2012 but, on 28 December, it was terminated by mutual consent, with the player returning to Spain and joining Deportivo de La Coruña.

In January 2014, 34-year-old Assunção signed for Levadiakos F.C. in the Super League Greece, leaving in June after failing to appear in any competitive matches.

Personal life
Assunção's son, Gustavo, is also a footballer and a midfielder.

Career statistics

Club

Honours
Porto
Primeira Liga: 2005–06, 2006–07, 2007–08
Taça de Portugal: 2005–06
Supertaça Cândido de Oliveira: 2006

Atlético Madrid
UEFA Europa League: 2009–10, 2011–12
UEFA Super Cup: 2010
Copa del Rey runner-up: 2009–10

São Paulo
Copa Sudamericana: 2012

References

External links

1980 births
Living people
People from Várzea Grande, Mato Grosso
Brazilian footballers
Association football midfielders
Campeonato Brasileiro Série A players
Sociedade Esportiva Palmeiras players
São Paulo FC players
Primeira Liga players
Segunda Divisão players
FC Porto B players
C.D. Nacional players
FC Porto players
Super League Greece players
AEK Athens F.C. players
Levadiakos F.C. players
La Liga players
Atlético Madrid footballers
Deportivo de La Coruña players
UEFA Europa League winning players
Brazilian expatriate footballers
Expatriate footballers in Portugal
Expatriate footballers in Greece
Expatriate footballers in Spain
Brazilian expatriate sportspeople in Portugal
Brazilian expatriate sportspeople in Greece
Brazilian expatriate sportspeople in Spain
Sportspeople from Mato Grosso